Epiphthora autoleuca is a moth of the family Gelechiidae. It was described by Edward Meyrick in 1904. It is found in Australia, where it has been recorded from Victoria.

The forewings are white, with a few minute fuscous speckles posteriorly. The hindwings are light grey.

References

Moths described in 1904
Epiphthora
Taxa named by Edward Meyrick